Sonny Curtis Webster (born 10 March 1994) is a British  weightlifter. He placed 14th at the 2016 Summer Olympics totaling 333kg. He is also the founder of the athletic sportswear brand Big Friday Supplies, and the head coach of The Lifting Zone (previously The Sonny Webster Academy).

Anti-doping violation and ban 

In December 2017, UK Anti-Doping announced that Webster tested positive for a banned substance, Ostarine, in May 2017 and had therefore received a four year ban from involvement in sport, to last until 13 June 2021. Webster says he spent his life savings unsuccessfully trying to overturn the drug ban.

Results

References

External links 
 
 
 
 
 

1994 births
Living people
British male weightlifters
Weightlifters at the 2016 Summer Olympics
Olympic weightlifters of Great Britain
Team Bath athletes
Weightlifters at the 2014 Commonwealth Games
Commonwealth Games competitors for England
21st-century British people